Dean Hugh Tekahu William Wickliffe (born 1948) is a notorious New Zealand criminal and prison escapee. He is the only person to have escaped Paremoremo maximum security prison twice, in 1976 and 1991. He was New Zealand's longest-serving prisoner.

Background 

His father was an alcoholic and his mother abandoned him at the age of seven after his parents separated. Wickliffe said he had: "a fractious and traumatic childhood that led him down the dark path of crime and the destruction of himself and others." When he was 15, Wickliffe tracked his mother down in Auckland where she was living with her two daughters.  She allowed him to move in provided he didn't drink. On his 16th birthday he came home under the influence and she kicked him out. Wickliffe said: "I went to stay at a caravan park and that's when I started to get into real trouble". He has Irish, Scottish and Maori ancestry and jokes that "my Celtic blood leads my Maori blood astray".

Criminal history 
Wickliffe was convicted of murdering jeweller Paul Miet during an armed robbery in 1972. At a retrial 12 years later, the charge was reduced to manslaughter based on Wickliffe's claim that he had not meant to hurt anyone. This decision was criticized by  Supreme Court Judge Sir Trevor Henry (then retired) because Wickliffe had been armed with a fully loaded semi-automatic pistol.

Wickliffe was released in 1995, but was later found guilty of murdering Bay of Plenty man, Richard Bluett. The conviction was quashed in 1998 and he was acquitted at a retrial.

In April 2010, Wickliffe was sentenced to two years and nine months imprisonment for drug and firearms offences committed in March 2008. In December 2011, six months after his release from that prison term, he was arrested for manufacture and possession of methamphetamine for supply and was sentenced to seven years imprisonment in March 2012.

In 2016, Wickliffe was denied parole, the Parole Board finding that he posed "an undue risk to the community." The board granted parole on 17 May 2017 and he was released, subject to nine conditions for 5 years.

References

New Zealand people convicted of murder
1948 births
New Zealand escapees
Living people
People convicted of murder by New Zealand
Place of birth missing (living people)
New Zealand people convicted of manslaughter
Escapees from New Zealand detention